Thin Man may refer to:

 The Thin Man, a 1933 mystery novel by Dashiell Hammett
The Thin Man (film) (1934), based on the novel
After the Thin Man (1936)
Another Thin Man (1939)
Shadow of the Thin Man (1941)
The Thin Man Goes Home (1945)
Song of the Thin Man (1947)
The Thin Man (TV series) (1957–1959), an NBC TV series based on the novel
Thin Man (nuclear bomb), an early nuclear weapon design named after Dashiell Hammett's character. 
The Thin Man, a character in the 1927 German expressionist film Metropolis
Thin Man (comics), a Marvel Comics character, unrelated to Hammett's novel
 The Thin Man, a character in the Charlie's Angels film series
Noble "Thin Man" Watts (1926–2004), American blues musician
Thin Man (band), Chinese punk band
Thin Man Films, a British film production company
Thin Man Press, a London-based publisher
"Thin Man", a song by Suzanne Vega from her 1996 album Nine Objects of Desire

See also
 "Ballad of a Thin Man", a 1965 song by Bob Dylan
 Slender Man, a fictional supernatural character that originated as a creepypasta Internet meme in 2009